A Scout Province is an administrative division within Scouting Ireland. Each province comprises a number of Scout Counties, which are mobilised and coordinated to combine their resources for the improvement of Scouting at a local level.

There are six Scout Provinces in Ireland: Dublin, Northern, North Eastern, Western, Southern and South Eastern. They are based on a geographical area of reasonable distance and the National Management Committee determines their boundaries.

The Scout Province is organised and administered by the Provincial Management/Support Team (PMST).  The primary role of the Scout Province is to support Scouting at local level by assisting and supporting Scout Counties in fulfilling their role and by assisting in the making of Scouting Ireland's policies and ensuring that these policies are carried out.

Wood Badge Training is carried out within Provinces by Provincial Training Co-ordinators and their teams, administrated by Provincial Support Officers, professional staff working in offices within each province.

Dublin Scout Province

Dublin Scout Province was formed on January 1, 2004 as Dublin Metropolitan Province after the two original Scout associations in Ireland, Scouting Ireland S.A.I. and Scouting Ireland (CSI) merged to form Scouting Ireland. Both associations voted to join to form a new single association in 2003, following a decision to set this process in motion in 1998. The Province renamed itself in February, 2008.

The  Provincial Commissioner is Helena Campbell.

There are 9 counties in the Province.

Cluain Toirc Scout County
Dodder Scout County
Dublinia Scout County
Dún Laoghaire Scout County
Liffey West Scout County
Mountpelier Scout County
Cois Farriage Scout County
Three Rock Scout County
Tolka Scout County

Northern Scout Province
The  Provincial Commissioner is Joe Corey.

There are 5 counties in the Province.

Brian Boru Scout County
Down & Connor Scout County
Erne Scout County
Errigal Scout County
Dalriada Scout County

North Eastern Scout Province
, the Provincial Commissioner is Thomas Martens.

There are 7 counties in the Province.

Cavan — Monaghan Scout County
Fingal Scout County
Reachra Scout County
Atha Cliath 15 Scout County
Gleann Na Boinne Scout County
Lakelands Scout County
Louth Scout County

Western Scout Province
The  Provincial Commissioner is Michelle Comer.

There are 5 counties in the Province.

Clare Scout County
Galway Scout County
Lough Keel Scout County
Mayo Scout County
Sligo Scout County

Southern Scout Province
The  Provincial Commissioner is Michael Dempsey.

There are 9 counties in the Province.
Cois Laoi Chorcaí Scout County
Cork South Scout County
Kerry Scout County
Lee Valley Scout County
Limerick Scout County
North Cork Scout County
Tipperary Scout County (replaced Tipp Cois Suir & Tipp North Scout Counties)
West Cork Scout County

South Eastern Scout Province
The  Provincial Commissioner is Kevin Murphy.

There are 7 counties in the Province.

Carlow-Kilkenny Scout County
Cill Dara Scout County
Cill Mhantáin Scout County
Slieve Bloom Scout County
South Kildare Scout County
Waterford Scout County
Wexford Scout County

References

External links
Scouting Ireland website

Province, Scout (Scouting Ireland)